J. W. Shattuck was a state legislator in Mississippi. He represented Wilkinson County, Mississippi in the Mississippi House of Representatives from 1874 to 1877.

He published a newspaper.

He and Samuel Riley represented Wilkinson County in the Mississippi House in 1874 while George W. White represented the county in the state senate.

References

Year of birth missing (living people)
Living people
People from Wilkinson County, Mississippi
Members of the Mississippi House of Representatives
Editors of Mississippi newspapers